Oskar Kamiński (born 1998), known professionally as Oki, is a Polish rapper, singer and songwriter.

Music career 
The rapper started releasing his first tracks back in 2013 on his YouTube channel. His first album Szanuj EP in collaboration with Mongoł was released in May 2014. He formed a duo with Girson called Microphone Killah. On April 19, 2015, their collaborative project, Microphone Killah Mixtape, hit the web. While on December 28 of the same year, Oki uploaded his solo C.R.E.A.M Mixtape.

He gained his first wave of popularity in March 2018 with the release of the album Oki & Nearr based on productions by Polish producer Nearr. In 2019 he released 47universe album and in 2020, he released 47playground, which featured guest appearances by Paluch, Szpaku, Gedz and ZetHa. That same year, Oskar also released a mixtape titled 77747 Mixtape. It is certified gold.

In March 2021, he formed the OIO band with Otsochodzi and Young Igi. Later that year, in May, the album OIO was released. It is certified double platinum.

On June 9, 2022, he released an album titled PRODUKT47 with guest features from Young Igi and Taco Hemingway.

Discography

Albums 

 Oki & Nearr (2018)
 47universe (2019)
 47plaground (2020)
 OIO (with Young Igi and Otsochodzi as OIO) (2021), ZPAV: 2× Platinum
 PRODUKT47 (2022) ZPAV: 2× Platinum

EPs 

 Szanuj EP (with Mongoł) (2014)

Mixtapes 

 Microphone Killah Mixtape (with Girson) (2015)
 C.R.E.A.M. Mixtape (2015)
 77747 Mixtape (2020), ZPAV: Gold
 47REMIX PACK (2020)

Notable singles 

 "Whoop?" (2018), ZPAV: Gold
 "Justin Bieber" (2019), ZPAV: Gold
 "SIRI" (featuring Gedz) (2020), ZPAV: Platinum

References 

1998 births
Polish rappers
Polish singers
Living people
People from Lublin